The 2016 Euro Cup of Australian rules football is a Nine-a-side footy tournament held in Lisbon, Portugal on 8 October 2016, with 15 national men's teams and seven women's teams.

Teams

Men
 Austria 
 Croatia
 Crusaders
 England
 France
 Germany
 Ireland
 Italy
 Netherlands
 Norway
 Peace Team Lions
 Portugal
 Russia
 Scotland
 Wales

Women
 Croatia
 Denmark
 England
 France
 Ireland
 Scotland
 Sweden

References

EU Cup
International sports competitions hosted by Portugal
2016 in Portuguese sport
2016 in European sport
2016 in Australian rules football
October 2016 sports events in Portugal